Wad Madani Airport was an airport formerly serving Wad Madani, a city in Sudan.

Google Maps shows the runway area is built over.

See also

Transport in Sudan
List of airports in Sudan

References

Defunct airports
Airports in Sudan